The Leduc Community Hospital located 20 kilometres south of Edmonton. There are a total of 70 beds, 34 acute care beds, plus 22 subacute beds and 14 transition beds.

Services 
The hospital provides may services including.
Surgical care
General and specialized day surgery
Rehabilitation programs
Laboratory services
Diagnostic imaging (x-ray, ultrasound, etc.)
Specialized outpatient clinics
24-hour emergency department

References 

Hospitals in Alberta
Edmonton Metropolitan Region
Leduc, Alberta